Boischampré is a commune in the Orne department in northwestern France. It was formed in 2015 by the merger of the former communes Saint-Christophe-le-Jajolet, Marcei, Saint-Loyer-des-Champs and Vrigny.

See also
Communes of the Orne department

References

Communes of Orne